Severny Kolchim is a rural locality (a settlement) in Krasnovishersky District, Perm Krai, Russia. The population was 631 as of 2010. There are 14 streets.

Geography 
Severny Kolchim is located 73 km southeast of Krasnovishersk (the district's administrative centre) by road. Verkhneye Zapolye is the nearest rural locality.

References 

Rural localities in Krasnovishersky District